Erdtmanithecales is an extinct order of gymnosperm plants known from the Mesozoic era. Known remains include pollen organs and seeds associated with Eucommiidites pollen, which is considered diagnostic for the order. The order was first described in 1996. While Eucommiidites pollen first appears in the Early Jurassic, associated floral remains are not found until the Early Cretaceous. It is thought that the group are closely related to Gnetales as well as possibly Bennettitales.

Systematics 

 Order Erdtmanithecales Friis and Pedersen 1996
family Erdtrnanithecaeae Friis and Pedersen 1996
Erdtmanitheca Pedersen, Crane & Friis, 1989 (pollen organ)
Erdtmanitheca portucalensis Mendes et al., 2010 (Aptian-Albian), Lusitanian Basin, Portugal 
Erdtmanitheca texensis Pedersen, Crane & Friis, 1989 Woodbine Formation, Texas, USA, Cenomanian 
Erdtmanispermum Pedersen, Crane & Friis, 1989 (seeds)
Erdtmanispermum juncalense Mendes et al., 2007 Berriasian, Lusitanian Basin, Portugal 
Erdtmanispermum balticum Pedersen, Crane & Friis, 1989 Jydegard formation, Denmark, Berriasian-Valanginian 
Eucommiitheca Friis and Pedersen 1996 (pollen organ)
Eucommiitheca hirsuta Friis and Pedersen 1996 Barremian-Aptian, Lusitanian Basin, Portugal 
Bayeritheca Kvaček and Pacltová, 2001 (pollen organ)
Bayeritheca hugesii Peruc-Korycany Formation, Bohemia, Czech Republic, Cenomanian 
 Incertae sedis
Araripestrobus Seyfullah, E.A.Roberts, A.R.Schmidt et L.Kunzmann, 2020 (pollen cones)
Araripestrobus resinosus Seyfullah, E.A.Roberts, A.R.Schmidt et L.Kunzmann, 2020, Crato Formation, Brazil, Aptian

References

Prehistoric plant orders
Mesozoic plants
Prehistoric gymnosperms